"There Goes My Baby" is a song by American R&B singer Charlie Wilson. It was released on October 24, 2008, as the second single of his fourth studio album Uncle Charlie, with the record labels Jive Records and Zomba Recording. The song was produced by Gregg Pagani and written by Babyface, Daryl Simmons, Kenneth Copeland, Marvin Eugene Smith, Gregg Pagani, Clarence Allen and Calvin Richardson. It was nominated at the Grammy Awards of 2010 for Best Male R&B Vocal Performance.

Background 
Wilson said: "When they presented me with this song, I knew it was a winner. I was in love with it." The song samples Rose Royce's song "Would You Please Be Mine".

Music video 
The music video,  directed by David Roma, features cameo appearances from Snoop Dogg.

Track listing 
Download digital
There Goes My Baby — 3:29

Commercial performance
"There Goes My Baby" debut for the Billboard Hot 100 chart dated May 16, 2009, entering the chart at number 98. The song topped Adult R&B Songs chart.

Charts

Weekly charts

Year-end charts

References

2009 songs
Songs written by Daryl Simmons
Charlie Wilson (singer) songs
Songs written by Babyface (musician)